The Solanaceae , or nightshades, are a family of flowering plants that ranges from annual and perennial herbs to vines, lianas, epiphytes, shrubs, and trees, and includes a number of agricultural crops, medicinal plants, spices, weeds, and ornamentals. Many members of the family contain potent alkaloids, and some are highly toxic, but many—including tomatoes, potatoes, eggplant, bell and chili peppers—are used as food. The family belongs to the order Solanales, in the asterid group and class Magnoliopsida (dicotyledons). The Solanaceae consists of about 98 genera and some 2,700 species, with a great diversity of habitats, morphology and ecology.

The name Solanaceae derives from the genus Solanum. The etymology of the Latin word is unclear. The name may come from a perceived resemblance of certain solanaceous flowers to the sun and its rays. At least one species of Solanum is known as the "sunberry". Alternatively, the name could originate from the Latin verb solare, meaning "to soothe", presumably referring to the soothing pharmacological properties of some of the psychoactive species of the family.

This family has a worldwide distribution, being present on all continents except Antarctica. The greatest diversity in species is found in South America and Central America.  In 2017, scientists reported on their discovery and analysis of a fossil species belonging to the living genus Physalis, Physalis infinemundi, found in the Patagonian region of Argentina, dated to 52 million years ago. The finding has pushed back the earliest appearance of the plant family Solanaceae.

The Solanaceae family includes a number of commonly collected or cultivated species. The most economically important genus of the family is Solanum, which contains the potato (S. tuberosum, in fact, another common name of the family is the "potato family"), the tomato (S. lycopersicum), and the eggplant or aubergine  (S. melongena). Another important genus, Capsicum, produces both chili peppers and bell peppers.

The genus Physalis produces the so-called groundcherries, as well as the tomatillo (Physalis philadelphica), Physalis peruviana (Cape gooseberry) and Physalis alkekengi (Chinese lantern). The genus Lycium contains the boxthorns and the goji berry, Lycium barbarum.  Nicotiana contains, among other species, tobacco. 
Some other important members of Solanaceae include a number of ornamental plants such as Petunia, Browallia, and Lycianthes, and sources of psychoactive alkaloids, Datura, Mandragora (mandrake), and Atropa belladonna (deadly nightshade).  Certain species are widely known for their medicinal uses, their psychotropic effects, or for being poisonous.

Most of the economically important genera are contained in the subfamily Solanoideae, with the exceptions of tobacco (Nicotiana tabacum, Nicotianoideae) and petunia (Petunia × hybrida, Petunioideae).

Many of the Solanaceae, such as tobacco and petunia, are used as model organisms in the investigation of fundamental biological questions at the cellular, molecular, and genetic levels.

Etymology and pronunciation
The name "Solanaceae" comes to international scientific vocabulary from New Latin, from Solanum, the type genus, + -aceae, a standardized suffix for plant family names in modern taxonomy. The genus name comes from the Classical Latin word solanum, referring to nightshades (especially Solanum nigrum), "probably from sol, 'sun', + -anum, neuter of -anus."

Description 

Plants in the Solanaceae can take the form of herbs, shrubs, trees, vines and lianas, and sometimes epiphytes. They can be annuals, biennials, or perennials, upright or decumbent. Some have subterranean tubers.  They do not have laticifers, nor latex, nor coloured saps. 
They can have a basal or terminal group of leaves or neither of these types. The leaves are generally alternate or alternate to opposed (that is, alternate at the base of the plant and opposed towards the inflorescence). The leaves can be herbaceous, leathery, or transformed into spines. The leaves are generally petiolate or subsessile, rarely sessile. They are frequently inodorous, but some are aromatic or fetid. The foliar lamina can be either simple or compound, and the latter can be either pinnatifid or ternate. The leaves have reticulated venation and lack a basal meristem.  The laminae are generally dorsiventral and lack secretory cavities. The stomata are generally confined to one of a leaf's two sides; they are rarely found on both sides.

The flowers are generally hermaphrodites, although some are monoecious, andromonoecious, or dioecious species (such as some Solanum or Symonanthus). Pollination is entomophilous. The flowers can be solitary or grouped into terminal, cymose, or axillary inflorescences.  The flowers are medium-sized, fragrant (Nicotiana), fetid (Anthocercis), or inodorous.   The flowers are usually actinomorphic, slightly zygomorphic, or markedly zygomorphic (for example, in flowers with a bilabial corolla in Schizanthus species). The irregularities in symmetry can be due to the androecium, to the perianth, or both at the same time. In the great majority of species, the flowers have a differentiated perianth with a calyx and corolla (with five sepals and five petals, respectively) an androecium with five stamens and two carpels forming a gynoecium with a superior ovary (they are therefore referred to as pentamers and tetracyclic). The stamens are epipetalous and are typically present in multiples of four or five, most commonly four or eight. They usually have a hypogynous disk. The calyx is gamosepalous (as the sepals are joined forming a tube), with the (4)5(6) segments equal, it has five lobes, with the lobes shorter than the tube, it is persistent and often accrescent.  The corolla usually has five petals that are also joined forming a tube. Flower shapes are typically rotate (wheel-shaped, spreading in one plane, with a short tube) or tubular (elongated cylindrical tube), campanulated or funnel-shaped.

The androecium has (2)(4)5(6) free stamens within it opposite sepals (they alternate with the petals). They are usually fertile or, in some cases (for example in Salpiglossideae) they have staminodes. In the latter case, there is usually either one staminode (Salpiglossis) or three (Schizanthus). The anthers touch on their upper end forming a ring, or they are completely free, dorsifixed, or basifixed with poricide dehiscence or through small longitudinal cracks.  The stamen's filament can be filiform or flat. The stamens can be inserted inside the coralline tube or exserted. The plants demonstrate simultaneous microsporogenesis, the microspores are tetrad, tetrahedral, or isobilateral.  The pollen grains are bicellular at the moment of dehiscence, usually open and angular.

The gynoecium is bicarpelar (rarely three- or five-locular) with a superior ovary and two locules, which may be secondarily divided by false septa, as is the case for Nicandreae and Datureae. The gynoecium is located in an oblique position relative to the flower's median plane. They have one style and one stigma; the latter is simple or bilobate. Each locule has one to 50 ovules that are anatropous or hemianatropous with axillar placentation. The development of the embryo sack can be the same as for Polygonum or Allium species. The embryo sack's nuclear poles become fused before fertilization. The three antipodes are usually ephemeral or persistent as in the case of Atropa. The fruit can be a berry as in the case of the tomato or wolfberry a dehiscent capsule as in Datura, or a drupe. The fruit has axial placentation. The capsules are normally septicidal or rarely loculicidal or valvate. The seeds are usually endospermic, oily (rarely starchy), and without obvious hairs. The embryo can be straight or curved, and has two cotyledons. Most species in the Solanaceae have 2n=24 chromosomes, but the number may be a higher multiple of 12 due to polyploidy. Wild potatoes, of which there are about 200, are predominantly diploid (2 × 12 = 24 chromosomes), but triploid (3 × 12 = 36 chromosomes), tetraploid (4 × 12 = 48 chromosomes), pentaploid (5 × 12 = 60) and even hexaploid (6 × 12 = 72 chromosome) species or populations exist. The cultivated species Solanum tuberosum has 4 × 12 = 48 chromosomes. Some Capsicum species have 2 × 12 = 24 chromosomes, while others have 26 chromosomes.

Diversity of characteristics 
Despite the previous description, the Solanaceae exhibit a large morphological variability, even in their reproductive characteristics.  Examples of this diversity include:
 
 The number of carpels that form the gynoecium
In general, the Solanaceae have a gynoecium (the female part of the flower) formed of two carpels. However, Melananthus has a monocarpelar gynoecium, there are three or four carpels in Capsicum, three to five in Nicandra, some species of Jaborosa and Trianaea and four carpels in Iochroma umbellatum.

 The number of locules in the ovary

The number of locules in the ovary is usually the same as the number of carpels.  However, some species occur in which the numbers are not the same due to the existence of false septa (internal walls that subdivide each locule), such as in Datura and some members of the Lycieae (the genera Grabowskia and Vassobia).

 Type of ovules and their number
The ovules are generally inverted, folded sharply backwards (anatropous), but some genera have ovules that are rotated at right angles to their stalk (campilotropous) as in Phrodus, Grabowskia or Vassobia), or are partially inverted (hemitropous as in Cestrum, Capsicum, Schizanthus and Lycium). The number of ovules per locule also varies from a few (two pairs in each locule in Grabowskia, one pair in each locule in Lycium) and very occasionally only one ovule is in each locule as for example in Melananthus.

 The type of fruit
The fruits of the great majority of the Solanaceae are berries or capsules (including pyxidia) and less often drupes.
Berries are common in the subfamilies Cestroideae, Solanoideae (with the exception of Datura, Oryctus, Grabowskia and the tribe Hyoscyameae) and the tribe Juanulloideae (with the exception of Markea). 
Capsules are characteristic of the subfamilies Cestroideae (with the exception of Cestrum) and Schizanthoideae, the tribes Salpiglossoideae and Anthocercidoideae, and the genus Datura. The tribe Hyoscyameae has pyxidia. 
Drupes are typical of the Lycieae tribe and in Iochrominae.

Alkaloids 
Alkaloids are nitrogenous organic substances produced by plants as a secondary metabolite and which have an intense physiological action on animals even at low doses.  Solanaceae are known for having a diverse range of alkaloids. To humans, these alkaloids can be desirable, toxic, or both. The tropanes are the most well-known of the alkaloids found in the Solanaceae. The plants that contain these substances have been used for centuries as poisons. However, despite being recognized as poisons, many of these substances have invaluable pharmaceutical properties.  Many species contain a variety of alkaloids that can be more or less active or poisonous, such as scopolamine, atropine, hyoscyamine, and nicotine. They are found in plants such as henbane (Hyoscyamus albus), belladonna (Atropa belladonna), jimson weed (Datura stramonium), mandrake (Mandragora autumnalis), tobacco, and others. Some of the main types of alkaloids are:

 Solanine: A toxic glycoalkaloid with a bitter taste, it has the formula C45H73NO15. It is formed by the alkaloid solanidine with a carbohydrate side chain. It is found in leaves, fruit, and tubers of various Solanaceae such as the potato and tomato. Its production is thought to be an adaptive defence strategy against herbivores. Substance intoxication from solanine is characterized by gastrointestinal disorders (diarrhoea, vomiting, abdominal pain) and neurological disorders (hallucinations and headache). The median lethal dose is between 2 and 5 mg/kg of body weight. Symptoms manifest 8 to 12 hours after ingestion. The amount of these glycoalkaloids in potatoes, for example, varies significantly depending on environmental conditions during their cultivation, the length of storage, and the variety. The average glycoalkaloid concentration is 0.075 mg/g of potato. Solanine has occasionally been responsible for poisonings in people who ate berries from species such as Solanum nigrum or Solanum dulcamara, or green potatoes.

 Tropanes: The term "tropane" comes from a genus in which they are found, Atropa (the belladonna genus). Atropa is named after the Greek Fate, Atropos, who cut the thread of life. This nomenclature reflects its toxicity and lethality. They are bicyclic organic nitrogen compounds (IUPAC nomenclature: 8-methyl-8-azabicyclo[3.2.1]octane), with the chemical formula of C8H15N. These alkaloids include, among others, atropine, cocaine, scopolamine, and hyoscyamine. They are found in various species, such as mandrake (Mandragora officinarum and M. autumnalis ), black henbane or stinking nightshade (Hyoscyamus niger), belladonna (Atropa belladonna), jimson weed or devil's snare (Datura stramonium) and Brugmansia , as well as many others in the family Solanaceae. Pharmacologically, they are the most powerful known anticholinergics in existence, meaning they inhibit the neurological signals transmitted by the endogenous neurotransmitter, acetylcholine. More commonly, they can halt many types of allergic reactions. Symptoms of overdose may include dry mouth, dilated pupils, ataxia, urinary retention, hallucinations, convulsions, coma, and death. Atropine, a commonly used ophthalmological agent,  dilates the pupils and thus facilitates examination of the interior of the eye.  In fact, juice from the berries of A. belladonna were used by Italian courtesans during the Renaissance to exaggerate the size of their eyes by causing the dilation of their pupils ("bella donna" means "pretty woman" in Italian). Despite the extreme toxicity of the tropanes, they are useful drugs when administered in extremely small dosages. They can reverse cholinergic poisoning, which can be caused by overexposure to organophosphate insecticides and chemical warfare agents such as sarin and VX.  Scopolamine (found in Hyoscyamus muticus and Scopolia carniolica), is used as an antiemetic against motion sickness or for people suffering from nausea as a result of receiving chemotherapy. Scopolamine and hyoscyamine are the most widely used tropane alkaloids in pharmacology and medicine due to their effects on the parasympathetic nervous system. Atropine has a stimulant effect on the central nervous system and heart, whereas scopolamine has a sedative effect. These alkaloids cannot be substituted by any other class of compounds, so they are still in demand. This is one of the reasons for the development of an active field of research into the metabolism of the alkaloids, the enzymes involved, and the genes that produce them. Hyoscyamine 6-β-hydroxylase, for example, catalyses the hydroxylation of hyoscyamine that leads to the production of scopolamine at the end of the tropane's biosynthetic pathway. This enzyme has been isolated and the corresponding gene cloned from three species: H. niger, A. belladonna and  B. candida.
  

 Nicotine: Nicotine (IUPAC nomenclature (S)-3-(1-methylpyrrolidin-2-yl) pyridine) is a pyrrolidine alkaloid produced in large quantities in the tobacco plant (Nicotiana tabacum).  Edible Solanaceae such as eggplants, tomatoes, potatoes, and peppers also contain nicotine, but at concentrations 100,000 to 1,000,000 times less than tobacco. Nicotine's function in a plant is to act as a defense against herbivores, as it is a very effective neurotoxin, in particular against insects. In fact, nicotine has been used for many years as an insecticide, though its use is currently being replaced by synthetic molecules derived from its structure. At low concentrations, nicotine acts as a stimulant in mammals, which causes the dependency in smokers. Like the tropanes, it acts on cholinergic neurons, but with the opposite effect (it is an agonist as opposed to an antagonist). It has a higher specificity for nicotinic acetylcholine receptors than other ACh proteins.

 Capsaicin: Capsaicin (IUPAC nomenclature 8-methyl-N-vanillyl-trans-6-nonenamide) is structurally different from nicotine and the tropanes. It is found in species of the genus Capsicum, which includes chilis and habaneros and it is the active ingredient that determines the Scoville rating of these spices. The compound is not noticeably toxic to humans. However, it stimulates specific pain receptors in the majority of mammals, specifically those related to the perception of heat in the oral mucosa and other epithelial tissues. When capsaicin comes into contact with these mucosae, it causes a burning sensation little different from a burn caused by fire. Capsaicin affects only mammals, not birds. Pepper seeds can survive the digestive tracts of birds; their fruit becomes brightly coloured once its seeds are mature enough to germinate, thereby attracting the attention of birds that then distribute the seeds. Capsaicin extract is used to make pepper spray, a useful deterrent against aggressive and peaceful mammals.

Distribution 

Even though members of the Solanaceae are found on all continents except Antarctica, the greatest variety of species are found in Central America and South America. Centers of diversity also occur in Australia and Africa. Solanaceae occupy a great number of different ecosystems, from deserts to rainforests, and are often found in the secondary vegetation that colonizes disturbed areas. In general, plants in this family are of tropical and temperate distribution.

Plant host 
The potato tuber moth (Phthorimaea operculella) is an oligophagous insect that prefers to feed on plants of the family Solanaceae, especially the potato plant (Solanum tuberosum). Female P. operculella use the leaves to lay their eggs and the hatched larvae will eat away at the mesophyll of the leaf. After feeding on the foliage, the larvae will then delve down and feed on the tubers and roots of the plant.

Taxonomy 
The following taxonomic synopsis of the Solanaceae, including subfamilies, tribes and genera, is based on the most recent molecular phylogenetics studies of the family:

Cestroideae (Browallioideae) 

 
This subfamily is characterised by the presence of pericyclic fibres, an androecium with four or five stamens, frequently didynamous. The basic chromosome numbers are highly variable, from x=7 to x=13. The subfamily consists of eight genera (divided into three tribes) and about 195 species distributed throughout the Americas. The genus Cestrum is the most important, as it contains 175 of the 195 species in the subfamily. The Cestreae tribe is unusual because it includes taxa with long chromosomes (from 7.21 to 11.511 µm in length), when the rest of the family generally possesses short chromosomes (for example between 1.5 and 3.52 µm in the Nicotianoideae)
 Browallieae Hunz.
 Browallia L., genus with six species distributed throughout the Neotropical realm to Arizona in the United States
 Streptosolen Miers, monotypic genus native to the Andes
 Cestreae tribe Don,  three genera of woody plants, generally shrubs
 Cestrum L., some 175 species distributed throughout the Neotropical realm
 Sessea Ruiz & Pav., 19 species from the Andes
 Vestia Willd., monotypic genus from Chile
 Salpiglossideae tribe (Benth.) Hunz. 
 Reyesia Gay, four species, three confined to northern Chile and one in both northern Chile and northern Argentina.
 Salpiglossis Ruiz & Pav., two species originating from southern South America

Goetzeoideae 

This subfamily is characterized by the presence of drupes as fruit and seeds with curved embryos and large fleshy cotyledons.  The basic chromosome number is x=13. It includes four genera and five species distributed throughout the Greater Antilles. Some authors suggest their molecular data indicate the monotypic genera Tsoala Bosser & D'Arcy should be included in this subfamily, endemic to Madagascar, and Metternichia to the southeast of Brazil. Goetzeaceae Airy Shaw is considered as a synonym of this subfamily.
 Coeloneurum Radlk., monotypic genus endemic to Hispaniola
 Espadaea Rchb., monotypic, from Cuba
 Goetzea Wydler, includes two species from the Antilles
 Henoonia Griseb., monotypic, originating in Cuba

Nicotianoideae

 Anthocercideae G.Don: This tribe, endemic to Australia, contains 31 species in seven genera. Molecular phylogenetic studies of the tribe indicate it is the sister of Nicotiana, and the genera Anthocercis, Anthotroche, Grammosolen, and Symonanthus are monophyletic.  Some characteristics are also thought to be derived from within the tribe, such as the unilocular stamens with semicircular opercula, bracteolate flowers, and berries as fruit.
 Anthocercis Labill., 10 species, Australia
 Anthotroche Endl., four species, Australia
 Crenidium Haegi, monotypic genus, Australia
 Cyphanthera Miers, 9 species, Australia
 Duboisia R.Br., four species, Australia 
 Grammosolen Haegi, two species, Australia 
 Symonanthus Haegi, two species, Australia
 Nicotianeae tribe Dum. 
 Nicotiana L., genus widely distributed, with 52 American species, 23 Australian, and one African

Petunioideae 

Molecular phylogenetics indicates that Petunioideae is the sister clade of the subfamilies with chromosome number x=12 (Solanoideae and Nicotianoideae). They contain calistegins, alkaloids similar to the tropanes.  The androecium is formed of four stamens (rarely five), usually with two different lengths.  The basic chromosome number of this subfamily can be x=7, 8, 9 or 11. It consists of 13 genera and some 160 species distributed throughout Central and South America. Molecular data suggest the genera originated in Patagonia. Benthamiella, Combera, and Pantacantha form a clade that can be categorized as a tribe (Benthamielleae) that should be in the subfamily Goetzeoideae. 
 Benthamiella Speg.,  12 species native to Patagonia
 Bouchetia Dunal, three neotropical species  
 Brunfelsia L., around 45 species from the neotropics
 Calibrachoa Cerv. ex La Llave & Lex., consists of 32 species from the neotropics. The morphological data suggest this genus should be included within the Petunia. However, the molecular and cytogenetic data indicate both should be kept separate. In fact, Calibrachoa has a basic chromosome number x=9, while that of Petunia is x=7. 
 Combera Sandw., two species from Patagonia
 Fabiana Ruiz & Pav., 15 species native to the Andes  
 Hunzikeria D'Arcy, three species from the southwest United States and Mexico  
 Leptoglossis Benth., seven species from  western South America 
 Nierembergia Ruiz & Pav., 21 species from South America 
 Pantacantha Speg.,  monospecific genus from Patagonia 
 Petunia  (Juss.) Wijsman, 18 species from South America 
 Plowmania Hunz. & Subils, monotypic genus from Mexico and Guatemala

Schizanthoideae 
 
The Schizanthoideae include annual and biennial plants with tropane alkaloids, without pericyclic fibres, with characteristic hair and pollen grains. The flowers are zygomorphic. The androecium has two stamens and three staminodes, anther dehiscence is explosive. In terms of fruit type, the  Schizanthoidae retain the plesiomorphic fruit form of the family Solanaceae, capsules, which rely on an anemochorous, abiotic form of dispersal. This is present in Schizanthoidae due both to the genetic constraints of early divergence (see below) as well as Schizanthus evolution and presence in open habitats.
The embryo is curved. The basic chromosome number is x=10. Schizanthus is a somewhat atypical genus among the Solanaceae due to its strongly zygomorphic flowers and basic chromosome number. Morphological and molecular data suggest Schizanthus is a sister genus to the other Solanaceae and diverged early from the rest, probably in the late Cretaceous or in the early Cenozoic, 50 million years ago. The great diversity of flower types within Schizanthus has been the product of the species' adaptation to the different types of pollinators that existed in the Mediterranean, high alpine, and desert ecosystems then present in Chile and adjacent areas of Argentina.
 Schizanthus Ruiz & Pav., 12 species originating from Chile.

Schwenckioideae 
Annual plants with pericyclic fibres, their flowers are zygomorphic, the androecium has four didynamous stamens or three staminodes; the embryo is straight and short. The basic chromosome number is x=12. It includes four genera and some 30 species distributed throughout South America. 
 Heteranthia Nees & Mart., one species from Brazil
 Melananthus Walp., five species from Brazil, Cuba, and Guatemala  
 Protoschwenckia Soler , monotypic genus from Bolivia and Brazil, some molecular phylogenetic studies have suggested this genus has an uncertain taxonomic position within the subfamily  
 Schwenckia L., 22 species distributed throughout the neotropical regions of America

Solanoideae 

 Capsiceae Dumort
 Capsicum L. includes 40 accepted neotropical species
 Lycianthes (Dunal) Hassler, some 200 species distributed throughout America and Asia
 Datureae G.Don, two genera are perfectly differentiated at both the morphological and molecular levels, Brugmansia includes tree species, while Datura contains herbs or shrubs, the latter genus can be divided into three sections: Stramonium, Dutra and Ceratocaulis. The monotypic genus Trompettia has recently been created to accommodate the Bolivian shrub formerly known as Iochroma cardenasianum - now known to belong to Datureae and not Physaleae as previously thought.
 Brugmansia Persoon, six species from the Andes
 Datura L., 12 neotropical species
 Trompettia J.Dupin, Single species from Andean Bolivia
 Hyoscyameae Endl.
 Anisodus Link, four species from China, India and the Himalayas
 Archihyoscyamus A.M.Lu, single species from Turkey and Iran.
 Atropa L., four Euro-Asiatic species
 Atropanthe Pascher, monotypic genus from China
 Hyoscyamus L., 10 accepted species distributed from the Mediterranean to China
 Physochlaina  G.Don, 6 accepted Euro-Asiatic species
 Przewalskia Maxim., 2 species from China
 Scopolia Jacq., disjunct distribution with two European species and two from East Asia.
 Jaboroseae Miers
 Jaborosa Juss., genus that includes 23 species from South America.
 Solandreae Miers
 Subtribe Juanulloinae consists 10 genera of trees and epiphytic shrubs with a neotropical distribution . Some of these genera (Dyssochroma, Merinthopodium and Trianaea) show a clear dependency on various species of bats both for pollination and dispersion of seeds.
 Dyssochroma Miers, two species from the south of Brazil
 Hawkesiophyton Hunz. two species from South America
 Juanulloa Ruiz & Pav., 11 species from South and Central America
 Markea Rich., 9 species from South and Central America
 Merinthopodium J. Donn. Sm. three species originating from South America
 Poortmannia Drake, one species, from Colombia, Ecuador and Peru (South America)
 Schultesianthus Hunz., eight neotropical species
 Trianaea Planch. & Linden, six South American species
 Subtribe Solandrinae, a monotypical subtribe, differs from Juanulloinae in that its embryos have incumbent cotyledons and semi-inferior ovaries.
 Solandra Sw., 10 species from the neotropical regions of America
 Lycieae Hunz. has three genera of woody plants, which grow in arid or semiarid climates. The cosmopolitan genus Lycium is the oldest in the tribe and it has the greatest morphological variability. Molecular phylogenetic studies suggest both Grabowskia and Phrodus should be included in the Lycium, and this genus, along with Nolana and Sclerophylax, form a clade (Lyciina), which currently lacks a taxonomic category. The red fleshy berries dispersed by birds are the main type of fruit in Lycium. The different types of fruit in this genus have evolved from the type of berry just mentioned to a drupe with a reduced number of seeds.
 Grabowskia Schltdl., three species from South America
 Lycium L., 83 cosmopolitan species
 Phrodus Miers, two species endemic to the north of Chile
 Mandragoreae (Wettst.) Hunz. & Barboza tribe does not have a defined systematic position according to molecular phylogenetic studies.
 Mandragora L., two species from Eurasia
 Nicandreae Wettst. is a tribe with two South American genera. Molecular phylogenetic studies indicate the genera are not interrelated nor are they related with other genera of the family, so their taxonomic position is uncertain.
 Exodeconus Raf., six species from western South America
 Nicandra Adans, one species distributed throughout neotropical regions
 Nolaneae Rchb. are mostly herbs and small shrubs with succulent leaves, they have very beautiful flowers that range from white to various shades of blue, their fruit is schizocarpal, giving rise to various nuts.
 Nolana L., 89 species distributed throughout western South America
 Physaleae Miers, is a large tribe that is the sister of Capsiceae.
 Subtribe Iochrominae (Miers) Hunz., a clade within the Physaleae tribe. contains 37 species, mainly distributed in the Andes, assigned to six genera. The members of this subtribe are characterized by being woody shrubs or small trees with attractive tubular or rotated flowers. They also possess great floral diversity, containing every type is present in the family. Their flowers can be red, orange, yellow, green, blue, purple, or white. The corolla can be tubular to rotated, with a variation of up to eight times in the length of the tube between the various species.
 Acnistus Schott, one species distributed throughout the neotropics
 Dunalia Kunth., five species from the Andes
 Eriolarynx Hunz., three species from Argentina and Bolivia
 Iochroma Benth., 24 species from the Andes
 Saracha Ruiz & Pav., two species from the Andes.
 Vassobia Rusby, two South American species
 Physalinae (Miers) Hunz. , a monophyletic subtribe, contains 10 genera and includes herbs or woody shrubs with yellow, white, or purple solitary axillary flowers pollinated by bees. Once pollination occurs, the corolla falls and the calyx expands until it entirely covers the boll that is developing (the calyx is called accrescent). In many species, the calyx turns yellow or orange on maturity. The berries contain many greenish to yellow-orange seeds, often with red or purple highlights.
 Brachistus Miers, three species from Mexico and Central America
 Chamaesaracha (A.Gray) Benth. & Hook., has 10 species from Mexico and Central America.
 Darcyanthus, genus with just 1 species originating in Bolivia and Peru.
 Leucophysalis Rydberg, includes 3 species from the south west of the United States and Mexico.
 Margaranthus Schlecht., with 1 species from Mexico.
 Oryctes S. Watson, monotypic genus from the south west of the United States.
 Physalis L., the largest genus of the subtribe, with 85 species distributed through the tropical regions of the Americas and with 1 species in China.
 Quincula Raf. with just 1 species from the south west of the United States and from Mexico.
 Trozelia Raf. with 2 species from Ecuador and Peru.
 Tzeltalia, genus segregated from Physalis, with 2 species distributed throughout Mexico and Guatemala.
 Witheringia L' Heritier, genus with 15 species from neotropical regions.
 Subtribe Salpichroinae, this is a subtribe of Physaleae that includes 16 American species distributed in 1 genera:
 Nectouxia Kunth., monotypic genus that is endemic to Mexico.
 Salpichroa Miers, genus with 15 species from the Andes and other regions of South America.
 Subtribe Withaninae, is a subtribe of Physaleae with a broad distribution, including 9 genera:
 Archiphysalis Kuang, with 3 species from China and Japan.
 Athenaea Sendtn., which includes 7 species from Brazil.
 Aureliana Sendtn., with 5 species from South America.
 Cuatresia Hunz., with 11 neotropical species. Molecular studies indicate that this genus, along with Deprea and Larnax has an uncertain taxonomic position.
 Deprea Raf., with 6 neotropical species.
 Larnax Miers, many taxonomists consider it to be a synonym for Deprea, contains 22 species native to the Andes.
 Mellissia Hook. f., monotypic genus from Saint Helena with the common name Saint Helena boxwood (genus recently subsumed in Withania)
 Nothocestrum A.Gray with 4 species from Hawaii.
 Physaliastrum Makino, with 10 Asiatic species (genus recently subsumed in Withania).
 Tubocapsicum (Wettst.) Makino, with just one species endemic to China.
 Withania Pauq., with 10 species native to the Canary Islands, Africa and Nepal.
 Tribe Solaneae. The genera Cyphomandra Sendtn., Discopodium Hochst., Normania Lowe, Triguera Cav. and Lycopersicum Mill have been transferred to Solanum. The subtribe is therefore composed of two genera:
 Jaltomata Schltdl., which contains 50 neotropical species.
 Solanum L., the largest genus in the family and one of the broadest of the angiosperms, with 1,328 species distributed across the whole world.

Incertae sedis

The following genera have not yet been placed in any of the recognized subfamilies within the solanaceas (incertae sedis).
 Duckeodendron Kuhlmannb, monotypic genus from the Amazon rainforest.
 Parabouchetia Baillon, poorly-known, monotypic genus from Brazil.
 Pauia Deb. & Dutta, monotypic genus from Assam and Arunachal Pradesh in N.E.India

Genera and distribution of species 

The Solanaceae contain 98 genera and some 2,700 species. Despite this immense richness of species, they are not uniformly distributed between the genera. The eight most important genera contain more than 60% of the species, as shown in the table below. Solanum – the genus that typifies the family - includes nearly 50% of the total species of the solanaceas.

Economic importance  

The family Solanaceae contains such important food species as the potato (Solanum tuberosum), the tomato (Solanum lycopersicum), the pepper (Capsicum annuum) and the aubergine or eggplant (Solanum melongena). Nicotiana tabacum, originally from South America, is now cultivated throughout the world to produce tobacco.
Many solanaceas are important weeds in various parts of the world. Their importance lies in the fact that they can host pathogens or diseases of the cultivated plants, therefore their presence increases the loss of yield or the quality of the harvested product. An example of this can be seen with Acnistus arborescens and Browalia americana that host thrips, which cause damage to associated cultivated plants, and certain species of Datura that play host to various types of virus that are later transmitted to cultivated solanaceas. Some species of weeds such as, Solanum mauritianum in South Africa represent such serious ecological and economic problems that studies are being carried out with the objective of developing a biological control through the use of insects.

A wide variety of plant species and their cultivars belonging to the Solanaceae are grown as ornamental trees, shrubs, annuals and herbaceous perennials Examples include Brugmansia x candida ("Angel's Trumpet") grown for its large pendulous trumpet-shaped flowers, or Brunfelsia latifolia, whose flowers are very fragrant and change colour from violet to white over a period of 3 days. Other shrub species that are grown for their attractive flowers are Lycianthes rantonnetii (Blue Potato Bush or Paraguay Nightshade) with violet-blue flowers and Nicotiana glauca ("Tree Tobacco")  Other solanaceous species and genera that are grown as ornamentals are the petunia (Petunia × hybrida), Lycium, Solanum, Cestrum, Calibrachoa × hybrida and  Solandra. There is even a hybrid between Petunia and Calibrachoa (which constitutes a new nothogenus called × Petchoa G. Boker & J. Shaw) that is being sold as an ornamental. Many other species, in particular those that produce alkaloids, are used in pharmacology and medicine (Nicotiana, Hyoscyamus, and Datura).

Solanaceae and the genome 
Many of the species belonging to this family, among them tobacco and the tomato, are model organisms that are used for research into fundamental biological questions. One of the aspects of the solanaceas' genomics is an international project that is trying to understand how the same collection of genes and proteins can give rise to a group of organisms that are so morphologically and ecologically different. The first objective of this project was to sequence the genome of the tomato. In order to achieve this each of the 12 chromosomes of the tomato's haploid genome was assigned to different sequencing centres in different countries. So chromosomes 1 and 10 were sequenced in the United States, 3 and 11 in China, 2 in Korea, 4 in Britain, 5 in India, 7 in France, 8 in Japan, 9 in Spain and 12 in Italy. The sequencing of the mitochondrial genome was carried out in Argentina and the chloroplast genome was sequenced in the European Union.

See also
 List of plants poisonous to equines

References

 
 
 
 Dimitri, M. 1987. Enciclopedia Argentina de Agricultura y Jardinería. Tomo I. Descripción de plantas cultivadas. Editorial ACME S.A.C.I., Buenos Aires.
 
 Hunziker, Armando T. 2001. The Genera of Solanaceae. A.R.G. Gantner Verlag K.G., Ruggell, Liechtenstein. .

Further reading

External links

 Sol Genomics Network
 Solanaceae Network - pictures of plants
 Solanaceae Source - A worldwide taxonomic monograph of all species in the genus Solanum.
 Solanaceae of Chile, by Chileflora
 Solanaceae  in L. Watson and M.J. Dallwitz (1992 onwards). The families of flowering plants: descriptions, illustrations, identification, information retrieval.   
 Solanaceae in USDA Plants Database.
 Family Solanaceae  Flowers in Israel
 SOL Genomics Network, Universidad de Cornell
 Imagines de various species of Solanaceae
 Solanaceae de Chile, by Chileflora
 Chilli: La especia del Nuevo Mundo (Article in Spanish by Germán Octavio López Riquelme regarding the biology, nutrition, culture and medical aspects of Chile.  
 Solanaceae Resources on the Web
 Jäpelt RB, Jakobsen J (2013) Vitamin D in plants: a review of occurrence, analysis, and biosynthesis. Front Plant Sci 4, No. 136 -- Note the reference to higher cholesterol levels (and consequent Vitamin D3 levels) in family Solanaceae

 
Asterid families